SM U-96 was a Type U 93 submarine and one of the 329 submarines serving in the Imperial German Navy in World War I. 
U-96 was engaged in the naval warfare and took part in the First Battle of the Atlantic. She was launched in 1917. On 6 December 1917, she collided with the submarine  at Barfleur, France; UC-69 sank with the loss of eleven of her crew. U-96 survived the war.

Design
German Type U 93 submarines were preceded by the shorter Type U 87 submarines. U-96 had a displacement of  when at the surface and  while submerged. The submarine was powered by two  engines for use while surfaced, and two  engines for use while submerged. She had two propeller shafts.

U-96 was fitted with six  torpedo tubes (four at the bow and two at the stern), twelve to sixteen torpedoes, and one  SK L/30 deck gun. She had a complement of thirty-six (thirty-two crew members and four officers).

Summary of raiding history

Original documents from Room 40

See also 
Room 40

References

Notes

Citations

Bibliography

External links
Photos of cruises of German submarine U-54 in 1916-1918.
A 44 min. German film from 1917 about a cruise of the German submarine U-35.

Room 40:  original documents, photos and maps about World War I German submarine warfare and British Room 40 Intelligence from The National Archives, Kew, Richmond, UK.

World War I submarines of Germany
German Type U 93 submarines
Ships built in Kiel
1917 ships
U-boats commissioned in 1917
Maritime incidents in 1917